The Attorney-General for Ireland was an Irish and then (from the Act of Union 1800) United Kingdom government office-holder. He was senior in rank to the Solicitor-General for Ireland: both advised the Crown on Irish legal matters. With the establishment of the Irish Free State in 1922, the duties of the Attorney-General and Solicitor-General for Ireland were taken over by the Attorney General of Ireland. The office of Solicitor-General for Ireland was abolished at the same time for reasons of economy. This led to repeated complaints from the first Attorney General of Ireland, Hugh Kennedy, about the "immense volume of work" which he was now forced to deal with single-handedly.

History of the Office 
The first record of the office of Attorney General for Ireland, some 50 years after the equivalent office was established in England, is in 1313, when Richard Manning was appointed King's Attorney (the title Attorney General was not used until the 1530s), at a salary of 5 marks a year. The Attorney General was initially junior to the serjeant-at-law, but since the titles of King's Serjeant and King's Attorney were often used interchangeably, it can be difficult to establish who held which office at any given time. Thomas Dowdall, for example, was called Serjeant-at-law and King's Attorney in the 1460s at almost the same time. Early holders of the office, including Manning, were also permitted to take private clients. Casey states that the records cast very little light on the duties of the Attorney-General in the early years, no doubt a reflection of his inferior status compared to the Serjeant-at-law.

There are at least two references to a Deputy Attorney-General. The first was in 1385, when Robert Hemynborough, or de Hemynborgh, was appointed Attorney-General "with power to appoint a Deputy". Two centuries later, Edward Butler, who became Attorney-General in 1582, had acted as Deputy from 1578 to 1580. Apart from these two examples, there is no evidence that the Deputy Attorney-General was a permanent position, nor do we know why it was considered necessary to appoint Butler to this office (pressure of work may be the explanation).

It seems that early Attorneys-General might be licensed to appear in certain courts only. William Rouse (1342), Peter de Leycestre (1357), William  Lynnoor (1359), Henry Mitchell (1372) and John Barry (1401) were all given a patent to plead in the Court of Common Pleas and the Court of Exchequer. John White was described in 1427 as "King's Attorney in the King's Bench and the Exchequer". The Serjeant-at-law, by contrast, was generally licensed to appear in all the Royal Courts, although John Haire in 1392 was described as "Serjeant-at-law of our Lord the King in the Common Pleas".

Perhaps because the Attorney-General was in the earlier centuries junior to the Serjeant-at-law, some holders of the office were probably not as highly qualified. Thomas Archbold (or Galmole), appointed Attorney-General in 1478, was a goldsmith by profession, and, perhaps more suitably, was also Master of the Royal Mint in Ireland.

The Attorney-General and the Serjeant-at-law 
In 1537 there was a short-lived attempt, following the report of a royal commission, to expand the role of the Attorney General, which would have involved the abolition of the office of King's Serjeant. The proposal was defeated largely through the firm opposition of the Serjeant-at-law, Patrick Barnewall, who argued that arguing cases for the Crown was and always had been the proper task of the Serjeant-at-law: "the King's Serjeant has always used to maintain the Pleas.... for this two hundred years and more". Why the more junior office was favoured over the much longer established office of Serjeant is not clear 

From the early 1660s, due largely to the personal prestige of Sir William Domville (AG 1660–1686), the Attorney General became the chief legal adviser to the Crown. In certain periods, notably during the reign of Elizabeth I, who thought poorly of her Irish-born law officers, the English Crown adopted a policy of choosing only English lawyers for this office, and also the Solicitor-General. Her successor King James I in 1620, on the appointment of Sir William Ryves, noted that the Attorney-General and Solicitor-General "have always been of the King's choice and special nomination", and that they were the Crown servants in whom the King places, above his other learned counsel and officers of the Court: "his more special trust regarding the preservation of his revenue and possessions". It is interesting that the King here seems to place the Attorney and the Solicitor above the Serjeant-at-law in importance.

Attorney-General in politics 
The Attorney-General, in later centuries at least, was always a member of the Privy Council of Ireland (in earlier centuries there were times when only the Serjeant-at-law attended the Council, but Stephen Roche, Attorney General 1441-44, attended the Great Council of 1441). 

A strong Attorney, like Philip Tisdall, William Saurin, or Francis Blackburne, could exercise great influence over the Dublin administration. Tisdall (AG 1760-1777), was for much of his tenure as Attorney General also the Government leader in the Irish House of Commons, and a crucial member of the administration. Saurin (AG 1807-1822) was regarded for many years as the effective head of the Dublin Government, until his career was ended by his opposition to Catholic Emancipation. In 1841 Blackburne (AG 1830–1834, 1841–1842), on being challenged about a proposed appointment within his own office, said firmly that he "would not  a refusal to ratify the appointment".

The office of Attorney General was described as being "a great mixture of law and general political reasoning".

Attorneys-General for Ireland, 1313–1922

14th century
 Richard Manning: appointed "King's Attorney" for Ireland 1313. Still in office in 1327.
 William de Woodworth: c. 1327
 Thomas of Westham: 1334
  William Rouse: 1342
 William le Petit: 1343
 Nicholas Lumbard, or Lombard: 1345
 Robert de Emeldon: 1348
 Robert Preston, 1st Baron Gormanston: 1355
 Peter de Leycestre, or Lecestre: 1357
 William Lynnoor: 1359
 Henry Mitchell: 1372; promoted to Chief Baron of the Irish Exchequer  1376
 Robert Hore, or le Hore: 1379, superseded 1381. He may have served a second term in 1383-4, as the Close Rolls have an order to pay his arrears of salary for those two years. In 1385 he was ordered not to "interefere" with the Office of Attorney-General any further.
 Thomas Malalo: 15 January 1381
 Robert Hemynborgh or de Hemynborough: 18 July 1385 (first term). He had the power to appoint a Deputy. His patent of office was renewed in 1407 on the same terms.

15th century
 William Tynbegh: 20 January 1400
 John Barry: appointed 16 February 1401; still in office in 1404 
 Robert de Hemynborough; appointed for a second term in 1407, in the same manner as King Richard II had previously granted  the office to him.
 John Whyte or White: appointed 13 October 1422; still in office 1426
 Stephen Roche: 1441
 William Sutton: 1444
 Robert FitzRery: 1450
 Thomas Dowdall: 1463 
 Nicholas Sutton: 1471 or 1472
 Thomas Archbold: 1478
 Thomas Cusacke: 1480
 Walter St. Lawrence: 1491
 Clement Fitzleones: 1499

16th century
 John Barnewall, 3rd Baron Trimlestown 1504
 Nicholas Fitzsimons: 1504

incomplete

 Thomas St. Lawrence: 18 August 1532
 Robert Dillon: August 1535
 Barnaby Skurloke or Skurlog: 1554
 James Barnewall: 3 September 1559
 Lucas Dillon: 8 November 1566
 Edward Fitz-Symon: 4 June 1570
 John Bathe: 21 February 1574
 Thomas Snagge: 13 September 1577
 Christopher Flemyng, or Fleming: 9 September 1580
 Edmund or Edward Butler: 8 August 1582
 Charles Calthorpe, afterwards Sir Charles: 22 June 1584

17th century
 Sir John Davys or Davies: 19 April 1606
 Sir William Ryves: 30 October 1619
 Richard Osbaldeston of Gray's Inn: 7 August 1636
 Thomas Tempest: 20 July 1640
 William Basil: 18 July 1649, under the Protectorate
 Robert Shapcote: 1660, under the Protectorate 
 Sir Wiliam Domville: 23 June 1660
 Sir Richard Nagle: 31 December 1686
 Sir John Temple: 30 October 1690

18th century

19th century

20th century

The office was vacant from 16 November 1921 and succeeded by the Attorney General of the Irish Free State on 31 January 1922. The office of Attorney General for Northern Ireland had been created in June 1921.

Notes, references and sources

Footnotes

References
 Haydn's Book of Dignities (for pre-1691 names and dates)

Further reading

External links
 Attorney-General for Ireland, list of office holders 1835–1921, with links to their Hansard contributions; from millbanksystems.com

 
Defunct ministerial offices in the United Kingdom
Lists of government ministers of the United Kingdom
Political office-holders in pre-partition Ireland